Anomacanthus is a genus of flowering plants belonging to the family Acanthaceae.

Its native range is Western Central Tropical Africa.

Species:

Anomacanthus congolanus

References

Acanthaceae
Acanthaceae genera